George Christiaansen was a Republican member of the Wisconsin State Assembly. He was elected in 1888.

Biography
Christiaansen was born on July 14, 1849. He later moved to Milwaukee, Wisconsin. From 1880 to 1884, he was a member of the Milwaukee Police Department.

References

Politicians from Milwaukee
Republican Party members of the Wisconsin State Assembly
Milwaukee Police Department officers
1849 births
Year of death missing